Symphonische Gesänge, Op. 20 is a set of songs for baritone (or alto) and orchestra composed in 1929 by Austrian composer Alexander von Zemlinsky.

Composition 

Zemlinsky composed the songs in the early part of 1929 and orchestrated them in the summer of that year while holidaying in Juan-les-Pins. The composer used texts extracted from a Viennese anthology of poems from the Harlem Renaissance entitled Afrika Singt, edited by Anna Nussbaum and published in early 1929. The set was dedicated to the memory of Zemlinsky's wife Ida who had died in January 1929. The text was edited by Wilhelm Grosz and translated by Jean Forman. 

Zemlinsky's direct experience of African societies and music was limited. However, he identified with the plight of black Americans as it reflected the post-World War I experience of many Jews in both Germany and Austria 

The work was premiered in a studio broadcast in Brno on 8 April 1935, conducted by Heinrich Jalowetz. The score was published in 1977 by Universal Edition.

Structure 

The set features a total of seven songs and has a performance duration of approximately 18 minutes. The titles of the songs are as follows:

The scoring is for an orchestra consisting of piccolo, two flutes, three oboes (3rd doubling cor anglais), two clarinets in B-flat, bass clarinet in B-flat (doubling clarinet in E-flat), three bassoons (3rd doubling contrabassoon), two horns in F, three trumpets in C, three trombones, bass tuba, timpani, percussion (3-4 players), mandolin and a full string section.

In common with other works from the same period such as his String Quartet No. 3 and his opera Der Kreidekreis, Zemlinsky relies on tight motivic cells, static ostinato patterns and restraint characteristic of Neue Sachlichkeit. The austere, Berg-like, pared-down style is far from the jazzy, rhythmic "swing" he used in some other compositions from this period, developed after having conducted Ernst Krenek's Jonny spielt auf and Kurt Weill's Aufstieg und Fall der Stadt Mahagonny, two operas that incorporate jazz elements into their musical idiom.

Recordings 

The following is a list of some of the most notable recordings of this work:

References 

Compositions by Alexander von Zemlinsky
1929 compositions